Neide mac Onchu  was an Irish lord.

Biography

Neidhe son of Onchu son of Finnlugh was described as the Cú Chulainn of the Conmaicne in an account of the battle of Ardrahan, which took place sometime about 800.

The Conmhaicne (descendants of Con Mhac) were an ethnic group divided into a number of distinct branches that scattered around Ireland in the early medieval period. They take their name from a mythical ancestor known as Con Mhac ("hound son"), a son of Fergus mac Róich,.

Neide's branch of the Conmaicne were located in the district once known as Trícha Máenmaige, centred on Loughrea, within which is the parish of Kilconickny (church of the Conmaicne). The Conmaicne Maonmhagh were located some distance from the other branches of the tribe, who were in north and west County Galway.

According to the account:
is hé tuc cath Arddo Rathain ind Úib Fiachrach Aidhni co tinól na Conmacne uimmi agus is ann romarbad Eidinn mac Clérigh agus sochaidi mille friss
it was he who waged the battle of Ard Rathain in Uí Fhiachrach Aidhne when he gathered the Conmhaicne around him. It was here that Eidhean mac Cléirigh was killed along with a great host.

External links
 Verschiedenes aus Egerton 1782, Corpus of Electronic Texts

References

 Early Ecclesiastical Settlement Names of County Galway, Dónall Mac Giolla Easpaig,Galway:History and Society - Interdisciplinary Essays on the History of an Irish County, pp. 795–816, Dublin, 1996. .
 Martyn, Adrian, The Tribes of Galway:1124–1642'', Galway, 2016. 

People from County Galway
8th-century Irish people
Irish lords
People of Conmaicne Mhein Maigh